Straylight may refer to:
 Stray light, unintended light in an optical system
 Ocular straylight, stray light produced in the human eye
 The Villa Straylight in William Gibson's 1984 cyberpunk novel Neuromancer
 Straylight Productions, a team of video game music composers and producers
 Straylight Studios, a game development studio
 Straylight Run, an American rock band